Stefan Lorenz Radt (4 August 1927, Berlin − 22 November 2017)  was a Dutch historian, author and academic specializing in ancient Greek geography.

Bibliography 

His books have received mostly positive reviews.

Some of his notable books are:r

 Tragicorum Graecorum Fragmenta
 Strabons Geographika
 The Importance Of The Context

References

External links
 http://www.goodreads.com/author/show/4585551.Stefan_Radt
 http://www.v-r.de/en/stefan_radt/p-0/7996

1927 births
2017 deaths
People from Berlin
Classical philologists
20th-century Dutch historians
Members of the Royal Netherlands Academy of Arts and Sciences
Scholars of ancient Greek history
University of Amsterdam alumni
Academic staff of the University of Groningen
Jewish emigrants from Nazi Germany to the Netherlands
Corresponding Fellows of the British Academy